The Italian-Thai Development Public Company Limited was formed on 15 August 1958 as the "Italian-Thai Corporation Company Limited" by its founders, Dr. Chaijudh Karnasuta and Mr. Giorgio Berlingieri. Their objective was to establish a Thai construction company. 
The company registered as a limited public company on 24 March 1994 and was listed on the Stock Exchange of Thailand (SET) on 9 August 1994 with the symbol, ITD.

Management
 the chairman was Dr. Krisorn Jittorntrum. Director and president was Mr. Premchai Karnasuta.

Financials
Consolidated revenues (company plus subsidiaries) was 48,389 million baht in 2016. Net profit was (minus) -48,389 million baht. Total assets were 78,120 million baht.  ITD employed 25,678 persons.

Italthai Group
Italian–Thai Development PCL is the umbrella company of Italthai Group although Italthai management insists that, "The management of the Italthai Group and its subsidiaries have nothing whatsoever to do with Italian-Thai Development" Italthai is a group of privately-owned businesses connected to Italian–Thai Development PCL. Its businesses are construction equipment, construction, hospitality, and lifestyle. The group employs more than 5,000 employees in seven countries across Asia Pacific.

References

External links
Italthai Group

Companies listed on the Stock Exchange of Thailand
Construction and civil engineering companies established in 1964
Companies based in Bangkok
1964 establishments in Thailand
Italy–Thailand relations